Pennywise is the debut studio album by the American punk rock band Pennywise, released on Epitaph Records on October 22, 1991.

Writing and production

Writing for the first Pennywise album began around 1989/1990. The band recorded it in 1991 at Westbeach Recorders in Hollywood, California. Epitaph owner/founder Brett Gurewitz actually produced the album. However, constant disagreements with guitarist Fletcher over the album's production and his dislike of the sound of the album prompted him to have his name taken off the credits in the liner notes.

Reception

Pennywise was released on October 22, 1991, and was the band's first album distributed via Epitaph Records. This self-titled debut made some impact upon its 1991 release, helping to re-establish the Southern Californian punk rock scene.

Track listing

Personnel
Fletcher Dragge – guitar
Jim Lindberg – vocals
Byron McMackin – drums
Jason Thirsk – bass

Fred Hidalgo – logo design, cover art
Gavin Oglesby – artwork, art direction

External links

Pennywise at YouTube (streamed copy where licensed)

Pennywise (band) albums
1991 debut albums
Epitaph Records albums